Zena Cecilia Walker (7 March 1934 – 24 August 2003) was an English actress in film, theatre and television.

Biography
Walker was born in the Selly Oak district of Birmingham, the daughter of George Walker, a grocer, and his wife Elizabeth Louise (née Hammond). She attended St. Martin's School in Solihull, and then went on to train at the Royal Academy of Dramatic Art.

She appeared twice in the TV series The Adventures of Robin Hood, the second time in the 1958 episode "Women's War".

In 1960, she starred in a TV adaptation of A. J. Cronin's novel The Citadel.

Her most memorable performance is considered that of a mother in A Day in the Death of Joe Egg (1969), a black comedy by Peter Nichols, adapted from his stage play, about a disabled child. For her performance in A Day in the Death of Joe Egg on Broadway, Walker won the 1968 Tony Award for Best Performance by a Featured Actress in a Play.

She was a memorable Ophelia in Hamlet (opposite Paul Scofield in the title role), and appeared as Her Ladyship in the film version of Ronald Harwood's play The Dresser (1983). Between 1970 and 1972, she appeared in the television series Man at the Top as Susan Lampton. She had a small role in the first series of New Tricks, playing Mrs Dubrovsky. 

Walker married three times. Her first two husbands were actors: Robert Urquhart, with whom she had two children, and later Julian Holloway. Her third husband was John French, a theatrical agent, who survived her. She died in 2003 in Brockenhurst, Hampshire, aged 69, from undisclosed causes. Her last role was as the messenger in Oedipus.

Filmography

References

External links

1934 births
2003 deaths
Alumni of RADA
People from Birmingham, West Midlands
British costume designers
Drama Desk Award winners
English film actresses
English stage actresses
English television actresses
Tony Award winners